Henry Chittleborough (14 April 1861 – 25 June 1925) was an Australian cricketer. He played two first-class matches for South Australia between 1883 and 1885.

See also
 List of South Australian representative cricketers

References

External links
 

1861 births
1925 deaths
Australian cricketers
South Australia cricketers
Cricketers from Adelaide